Physalospora abdita is a plant pathogen that causes cankers on pecan and avocado.

External links
 USDA ARS Fungal Database

Fungal tree pathogens and diseases
Avocado tree diseases
Nut tree diseases
Xylariales
Fungi described in 1942